The Happy Loner is a two-episode Korean drama that aired on KBS2 from May 8 to May 9, 2017, starring Min Hyo-rin and Gong Myung.

Synopsis 
A thorough individualist, Ji-young, who avoids relationships with others, meets Byuk-soo, who can't live without having relationships.

Cast 
 Min Hyo-rin as Na Ji-young
 Kang Joo-ha as Na Ji-young (child)
 Ryu Han-bi as Na Ji-young (young)
 Gong Myung as Park Byuk-soo
Oh Na-ra as Jung Soo-kyung
 Ji Il-joo as Yeon-suk
 Jang Hee-ryung as Ye-jin
 Kang Jae-joon as Choi Dae-ri
Kim Jae-hwa as Nurse Park
 Yoon Ji-won as Nurse Kim
 Yoon Bok-in as Na Ji-young's mother 
 Jo Seung-yeon as Na Ji-young's father 
 Kim Hee-ryung as Park Byuk-soo's mother-in-law
 Kim Sun-ha as Na Ji-young's colleague 
 Sujin as Park Yeon-hee

Ratings
In this table,  represent the lowest ratings and  represent the highest ratings.

Awards and nominations

References

External links
 
 

Korean Broadcasting System television dramas
2017 South Korean television series debuts
2017 South Korean television series endings
Korean-language television shows
South Korean romantic comedy television series